Svendsen går videre (Svendsen Goes On) is a Norwegian film from 1949 directed by Nils R. Müller. It is the story of one man's struggle against bureaucracy. It was a campaign film partially financed by Norway's Conservative Party.

Plot
Svendsen is played by Carsten Byhring, who wrote the script. He goes out to buy tobacco and meets various people. Through these meetings, it is clear that the state, with its taxes and fees, is the only party that benefits from the transactions.

Cast

 Carsten Byhring as Svendsen
 Henki Kolstad as Henrik, a member of the Labor Party
 Kari Diesen as Ophelia Andersen
 Arvid Nilssen as Christian Andersen
 Carsten Winger as a bookstore clerk
 Erna Schøyen		
 Einar Vaage		
 Helge Essmar		
 Bjarne Bø		
 Hans Bille		
 Johannes Eckhoff		
 Sophus Dahl		
 Arve Opsahl		
 Gaselle Müller		
 Eugen Skjønberg		
 Erik Lassen
 Dan Fosse		
 Finn Mehlum		
 Sigurd Werring

References

External links
 
 Svendsen går videre at Filmfront

1949 films
Norwegian drama films
Norwegian black-and-white films
Conservative Party (Norway)
Films directed by Nils R. Müller